The 2004 UEFA Cup Final was an association football match that took place on 19 May 2004 at Ullevi in Gothenburg, Sweden, contested between Spanish side Valencia and French side Olympique de Marseille. Valencia won the match 2–0, with goals from Vicente and Mista. This was the fourth major European trophy won by Valencia.

Route to the final

Valencia CF

Olympique de Marseille

Match summary
Valencia had been on a 14-match unbeaten run previous to this match, which had only ended the previous week to Villarreal, the side they beat in the semi-final to reach the final, due to a weakened lineup after securing the La Liga title. In contrast, Marseille had lost four of their last five matches in Ligue 1.

The start of the match was conservative due to the wind. Didier Drogba threatened early on, and was sent tumbling by a robust challenge from Roberto Ayala, which led to a free kick, in which the resulting shot was cleared off the line by Carlos Marchena. This sparked Valencia into life and David Albelda produced a save from Fabien Barthez after pouncing on Mista's rebounded shot.

Valencia dominated possession, which led to frustration, and Steve Marlet getting booked in the tenth minute. Marseille's first meaningful attempt at goal came in the 16th minute when Steve Marlet headed over from Camel Meriem's cross. Minutes later, Meriem himself had a chance to give Marseille the lead, but he shot wide from the edge of the area. Marseille had another chance when Habib Beye got on the end of Drogba's free kick, but he headed wide. The definitive moment in the match came on the stroke of half time, when Barthez brought down Mista in the area after a  cross by Curro Torres. Barthez was sent off and Valencia were awarded a penalty. Jérémy Gavanon replaced Barthez with Camel Meriem making way for him. Vicente dispatched the penalty to give Valencia a 1–0 lead going into half time.

The second half started off with Valencia in total ascendancy, and after 13 minutes of near-total possession, Valencia doubled their lead. Vicente had cut the ball in from the left for Mista, who finished the chance with ease to record his fifth goal of the competition. Marseille's heads inevitably dropped. They came forward in flourishes in the last remnants of the game, however, when Drogba's free kick was stopped by Santiago Cañizares. Drogba also nearly played in Steve Marlet with a through-ball, but it was intercepted at the last second. Marseille almost found a way back into the Valencia goal area in the 80th minute, but Sylvain N'Diaye's shot was saved by Cañizares.

After this, the match descended into a stoic affair and Valencia ran out winners to win their first major European trophy in 24 years, and victory after two successive UEFA Champions League final defeats, in 2000 and 2001. The victory also meant that Amedeo Carboni became the oldest player to win a European final at 39 years and 43 days old.

Match

Details

Statistics

See also
2003–04 UEFA Cup
2004 UEFA Super Cup
Olympique de Marseille in European football
Valencia CF in European football

References

External links
2003–04 season at UEFA.com

Uefa Cup Final 2004
Uefa Cup Final 2004
2004
Uefa Cup Final 2004
2
International club association football competitions hosted by Sweden
Uefa
UEFA
Final
May 2004 sports events in Europe
International sports competitions in Gothenburg
2000s in Gothenburg